The women's madison competition at the 2022 UEC European Track Championships was held on 16 August 2022.

Results
150 laps (30 km) with 15 sprints were raced.

References

Women's madison
European Track Championships – Women's madison